Demmy is a given name and surname. Notable people with the name include:

Demmy Druyts (born 1995), Belgian racing cyclist
John Demmy (1904–1970), American football player
Lawrence Demmy (died 2016), British ice dancer

See also
Demme
Jemmy (disambiguation)